Bridge of Don Thistle Football Club is a Scottish football club from Aberdeen. Members of the Scottish Junior Football Association, they currently play in the  SJFA North Superleague.

History
The club was founded in 1983 as Wilson's XI F.C., named after Norman Wilson, the club's first president and main sponsor. Originally competing in the Aberdeenshire Amateur Football Leagues, the club joined the SJFA, North Region in 2000. On joining the Juniors, the club moved from local playing fields into the Hillhead Centre. This ground, originally known as Keith Park, was the purpose built home of another Junior club, Aberdeen Bon Accord. After Bon Accord folded in 1997, the facility was taken over by the University of Aberdeen who renamed it the Hillhead Centre.

In 2006, Wilson's XI took the name Hillhead F.C. For the 2011–12 season, however, the club renamed themselves Bridge of Don Thistle to broaden their appeal among the local community. 

With Aberdeen University joining the Junior grade in 2014, Thistle continued to groundshare between the Hillhead Centre and Aberdeen Sports Village during the 2014–15 season. The club eventually relocated to Gallowshill Park in the village of Newburgh, Aberdeenshire. At the end of the 2015–16 season, the club renamed themselves Newburgh Thistle. In 2018 they reverted to the Bridge of Don Thistle name and returned to Aberdeen, with Aberdeen Sports Village as their new home ground.

The club won promotion in their first season in Junior football but have yet to win any honours outright.

Name history

References

External links
 

Football clubs in Scotland
Football clubs in Aberdeen
Scottish Junior Football Association clubs
Association football clubs established in 1983
1983 establishments in Scotland
Football in Aberdeenshire